Gin Phillips (Birmingham, Alabama) is an American author. Her first novel, The Well and the Mine, was awarded the 2009 Barnes & Noble Discover Award, a $10,000 prize for a first novel. Her second novel, Come in and Cover Me, was published in 2012. She published two novels for children:The Hidden Summer in 2013 and A Little Bit of Spectacular in 2015..

Phillips grew up in Montgomery, Alabama, and graduated from Birmingham–Southern College in 1997. Her second novel, Come in and Cover Me, is a mystery novel about an archeologist in New Mexico who experiences visions of a 12th-century potter from the Mimbres culture.

Bibliography

The Well and The Mine (2007)
Come In and Cover Me (2012)
The Hidden Summer (2013)
A Little Bit of Spectacular (2015)
Fierce Kingdom (2017)
Family Law (2022)

References

External links

21st-century American novelists
American women novelists
Birmingham–Southern College alumni
Writers from Montgomery, Alabama
Living people
21st-century American women writers
Novelists from Alabama
Year of birth missing (living people)